David Hutcheson (14 June 1905 – 18 February 1976) was a British character actor. He made his film debut in Fast and Loose in 1930 and played his only lead role in 1934's Romance in Rhythm. He went on to specialise in hooray henrys, silly asses and military types most prominently in Michael Powell and Emeric Pressburger's The Life and Death of Colonel Blimp (1943) and Peter Ustinov's School for Secrets (1946) and Vice Versa (1948). He continued in film and television until the 1970s. During the 1960s he often played the role of Colonel Pickering in stage productions of My Fair Lady.

On 25 March 1949 he married Mary, Countess of Warwick, (née Mary Kathleen Hopkinson),  the former wife of Charles Greville, 7th Earl of Warwick. This was shortly after the Earl of Warwick divorced his wife because of her adultery with Hutcheson.

Selected filmography

 Fast and Loose (1930) - Lord Rockingham
 Romance in Rhythm (1934) - Bob Mervyn
 The Love Test (1935) - Thompson
 Wedding Group (1936) - George Harkness
 This'll Make You Whistle (1936) - Archie Codrington
 The Sky's the Limit (1938) - Teddy Carson
 A Gentleman's Gentleman (1939) - Bassy
 Lucky to Me (1939) - Peter Malden
 She Couldn't Say No (1940) - Peter Thurston
 The Middle Watch (1940) - Cmdr. Baddeley
 Convoy (1940) - Captain Sandeman
 Bulldog Sees It Through (1940) - Freddie Caryll
 The Next of Kin (1942) - Intelligence officer
 Sabotage at Sea (1942) - Capt. Richard Tracey
 The Life and Death of Colonel Blimp (1943) - Hoppy
 Theatre Royal (1943) - Harry (uncredited)
 The Hundred Pound Window (1944) - Steve Halligan
 The Way Ahead (1944) - Garage Customer in Car (uncredited)
 The Trojan Brothers (1946) - Cyril Todd
 School for Secrets (1946) - Squadron Leader Sowerby
 Vice Versa (1948) - Marmaduke Paradine
 Sleeping Car to Trieste (1948) - Denning
 Woman Hater (1948) - Robert
 The Small Back Room (1949) - Norval
 Madness of the Heart (1949) - Max Ffoliott
 My Daughter Joy (1950) - Annix
 The Fighting Pimpernel (1950) - Lord Anthony Dewhurst
 Circle of Danger (1951) - Tony Wrexham
 No Highway in the Sky (1951) - Penworthy, Test Pilot (uncredited)
 Encore (1951) - Sandy Wescott (segment "Gigolo and Gigolette")
 Something Money Can't Buy (1952) - Buster
 The Big Money (1956) - Tipster at Racecourse (uncredited)
 The Birthday Present (1957) - Ex. R.A.F. Type
 Law and Disorder (1958) - Freddie Cooper
 The Evil of Frankenstein (1964) - Burgomaster
 The Amorous Adventures of Moll Flanders (1965) - Doctor
 Triple Cross (1966) - Ministry Official
 The Magic Christian (1969) - Lord Barry
 Every Home Should Have One (1970) - Stockbroker
 The Abominable Dr. Phibes (1971) - Dr. Hedgepath
 Public Eye (1971, TV Series) - Sir Roger L'Ettrell
 Follow Me! (1972) - Dinner Guest (uncredited)
 The National Health (1973) - Mackie

References

External links

1905 births
1976 deaths
British male film actors
20th-century British male actors